Helconinae is a subfamily of braconid wasps in the family Braconidae. This is a large subfamily with many changes to classification and included groups over the years. There are about 40 genera worldwide in this subfamily.

Genera
These three genera belong to the subfamily Helconinae:
 Eumacrocentrus Ashmead, 1900 c g b
 Helcon Nees von Esenbeck, 1812 c g b
 Wroughtonia Cameron, 1899 c g b
Data sources: i = ITIS, c = Catalogue of Life, g = GBIF, b = Bugguide.net

References

Further reading

External links

 

Parasitic wasps